Venegono may refer to the following places in the Province of Varese, Italy:

 Venegono Inferiore
 Venegono Superiore